Thomas Alexander Chignell (31 October 1880 — 25 August 1965) was an English first-class cricketer and dentist. 

Chignell was born at Havant in October 1880. A club cricketer for Havant Cricket Club, who he also assisted for many years, Chignell made his debut in first-class cricket for Hampshire against Kent at Tonbridge in the 1901 County Championship. He played first-class cricket occasionally for Hampshire until 1904, making eighteen appearances. Described by Wisden as a "slow bowler" who "played some useful innings", he scored 181 runs in his eighteen matches, at an average of 10.05 and with a highest score of 29 not out. With the ball, he took 33 wickets at a bowling average of 33.57; he took one five wicket haul, with figures of 5 for 68 against Derbyshire in 1903. Outside of cricket, Chignell was a dentist. He ran a dental practice in Emsworth. Chignell died at the Royal Portsmouth Hospital in August 1965.

References

External links

1880 births
1965 deaths
People from Havant
English cricketers
Hampshire cricketers
English dentists